Tharman Shanmugaratnam (Tamil: தர்மன் சண்முகரத்தினம்; born 25 February 1957) is a Singaporean politician and economist who has served as Singapore's Deputy Prime Minister between 2011 and 2019, and as Senior Minister in the Cabinet since 2019. He has also been the Coordinating Minister for Social Policies since 2015 and Chairman of the Monetary Authority of Singapore since 2011. He previously held the roles of Minister for Education from 2003 and 2008, Minister for Finance from 2007 and 2015, and Coordinating Minister for Economic and Social Policies from 2015 to 2019. A member of Singapore's governing People's Action Party (PAP), he has been a Member of Parliament (MP) representing the Taman Jurong division of Jurong GRC since 2001. He has also been serving as Deputy Chairman of GIC.

An economist by profession, Tharman has worked in both the public and private sectors, both domestically and abroad. He has spent most of his working life in public service, in roles principally related to economic and social policies. 

Tharman chairs the board of the Group of Thirty, a global council of economic and financial leaders from the public and private sectors and academia. He also co-chairs the Global Commission on the Economics of Water, whose recommendations will be considered in the UN Water Conference in 2023 (the first since 1977). He is in addition a member of the United Nations' High-Level Advisory Board on Effective Multilateralism, that will make recommendations on Effective Multilateralism for the UN's 2024 Summit of the Future.  

Tharman co-chaired the G20 High Level Independent Panel on Global Financing for Pandemic Preparedness and Response alongside fellow economists Ngozi Okonjo-Iweala and Lawrence Summers in 2021. He previously led the G20 Eminent Persons Group on Global Financial Governance. He also chaired the International Monetary and Financial Committee (IMFC), the International Monetary Fund's key policy forum, for four years, becoming the first Asian chair. 

In addition, he currently co-chairs the Advisory Board for the United Nations Development Programme's (UNDP) Human Development Report (HDR), and is a member of the World Economic Forum's (WEF) Board of Trustees. He also co-chairs the Global Education Forum.

Tharman made his political debut in the 2001 general election, and has been re-elected to Parliament four times at subsequent general elections in 2006, 2011, 2015 and 2020.

Early life and education 
Born in Singapore, Tharman attended the Anglo-Chinese School before graduating from the London School of Economics (LSE) with a Bachelor of Science degree in economics. LSE later awarded him an Honorary Fellowship in 2011. 

He subsequently obtained a Master of Philosophy degree in economics from the University of Cambridge, and a Master in Public Administration degree from Harvard Kennedy School at Harvard University, where he received a Lucius N. Littauer Fellow award for his outstanding performance and potential. 

Tharman was a student activist while studying in the United Kingdom during the 1970s. He originally held socialist beliefs, but his views on economics evolved over the course of his working career.

Political career 
Tharman was first elected a Member of Parliament following the 2001 general election for Jurong GRC, having won 79.75% of the votes. Shortly after the 2001 elections, Tharman was appointed Senior Minister of State at the Ministry of Trade and Industry and the Ministry of Education. He then served as the Minister for Education from 2003 to 2008.

After being re-elected at the 2006 general election, Tharman was also appointed Second Minister for Finance before becoming Minister for Finance on 1 December 2007.

Following the 2011 general election, Tharman was appointed Deputy Prime Minister, while remaining as Minister for Finance. He served concurrently as the Minister for Manpower between May 2011 to July 2012. He stepped down as Minister for Finance in September 2015 after 9 years. 

At the 2015 general election, Jurong GRC, helmed by Tharman, garnered a vote share of 79.3% against a Singaporeans First (SingFirst) team. Tharman has been elected to the Central Executive Committee of the People's Action Party since Dec 2002, and was appointed 2nd Assistant Secretary-General in May 2011. After the election, Tharman remained Deputy Prime Minister and was also appointed as Coordinating Minister for Economic and Social Policies in October 2015.

In May 2017, the National Trades Union Congress (NTUC) conferred on Tharman the Medal of Honour, the highest of its May Day Awards. NTUC cited amongst other things "his deep commitment to building an inclusive society".

On 23 April 2019, the Prime Minister Office's cabinet reshuffle announced that Tharman, alongside Teo Chee Hean, would be appointed Senior Ministers effective from 1 May, relinquishing their respective Deputy Prime Minister portfolios. Tharman would also be Coordinating Minister for Social Policies and advise the Prime Minister on economic policies.

Tharman was re-elected at the 2020 general election, with the Jurong GRC team he led winning 74.62% of the votes against Red Dot United.

Career before politics 
Prior to entering politics, Tharman started his career at the Monetary Authority of Singapore (MAS), where he became its chief economist. He later joined the Singapore Administrative Service and served in the Ministry of Education as Senior Deputy Secretary for Policy, before returning to the MAS where he eventually became its Managing Director. He resigned from this position to contest in the 2001 general election as a candidate for the People's Action Party.

Official Secrets Act case
While serving as director of the Economics Department of the MAS in 1992, Tharman was one of five persons charged under the Official Secrets Act (OSA) in a case involving the publication of Singapore's 1992 second-quarter flash GDP growth projections in the Business Times newspaper. The others included the editor, Patrick Daniel, of the Business Times.

The OSA case, which stretched over more than a year, was reported extensively in the Singapore press. Tharman contested and was eventually acquitted of the charge of communicating the GDP growth flash projections. The District Court then introduced a lesser charge of negligence, as the prosecution's case had been that the figures were seen on a document that he had with him on a table during his meeting with private sector economists together with one of his colleagues. Tharman also contested this lesser charge of negligence, and defended himself on the witness stand for a few days.

The Court nevertheless convicted him together with all the others in the case. Tharman was fined S$1,500, and the others S$2,000. As there was no finding that he communicated any classified information, the case did not pose any hurdle to his subsequent appointment as the Managing Director of the MAS, nor to his subsequent larger national responsibilities.

Other national and international appointments 

Tharman has been the chairman of the Monetary Authority of Singapore (MAS) since May 2011. He was appointed as the Deputy Chairman of the Government of Singapore Investment Corporation (GIC) as of May 2019, and chairs its Investment Strategy Committee.

Tharman led the SkillsFuture programme, launched in 2014 with the aim of developing skills of the future, and opportunities for life-long learning and job upskilling among Singaporeans. He subsequently chaired the tripartite Council for Skills, Innovation and Productivity (CSIP) until May 2017.

He currently also chairs the Economic Development Board's International Advisory Council, and the International Academic Advisory Panel that advises the Government on strategies for the university sector.

In April 2017, Tharman was appointed by the G20 to chair a G20 Eminent Persons Group on Global Financial Governance. In Oct 2018, the Group proposed reforms for a more effective system of global development finance and for financial stability. Tharman also succeeded Jean-Claude Trichet as Chairman of the Group of Thirty, an independent global council of leading economic and financial policy-makers from January 1, 2017.Tharman was succeeded by Mark Carney, and at the same time appointed Chairman of the Board of Trustees from January 1, 2023.

Tharman had previously been appointed by his international peers as Chairman of the International Monetary and Financial Committee (IMFC), the key policy forum of the IMF, for an extended period of four years from 2011; he was its first Asian chair. In announcing Tharman's selection, the IMF said that his "broad experience, deep knowledge of economic and financial issues, and active engagement with global policy makers will be highly valuable to the IMFC".

Since 2019, Tharman has been the co-chair of the Advisory Board for UN's Human Development Report. He co-chaired with Thomas Piketty in 2019 and Michael Spence for the 2020 edition, and is co-chairing the Advisory Board for the 2021/22 edition with Michele Lamont.

In May 2019, Tharman was admitted to the World Economic Forum Board of Trustees.

Among his other roles, he chairs the Board of Trustees of the Singapore Indian Development Association (SINDA), which seeks to uplift educational performance and aspirations in the Indian Singapore community. He also chairs the Ong Teng Cheong Labour Leadership Institute.

In January 2021, Tharman was appointed by the G20 to co-chair the G20 High Level Independent Panel (HLIP) on Financing the Global Commons for Pandemic Preparedness and Response, together with Ngozi Okonjo-Iweala and Lawrence Summers. In March 2022, Tharman was appointed as a member of the United Nations’ High Level Advisory Board on Effective Multilateralism.

More recently, he chaired the National Jobs Council aimed at rebuilding skills and jobs for Singaporeans in the wake of the COVID-19 pandemic.

Personal life

Ancestry and family
Tharman is a Singaporean of Sri Lankan Tamil ancestry. One of three children, he is the son of Emeritus Professor K. Shanmugaratnam, a medical scientist known as the "father of pathology in Singapore", who founded the Singapore Cancer Registry and led a number of international organisations related to cancer research and pathology.

Tharman is married to Jane Yumiko Ittogi, a lawyer of Chinese-Japanese descent. She is actively engaged in social enterprise and the non-profit arts sector. The couple have one daughter and three sons.

Miscellaneous
Tharman was an active sportsman in his youth, and has highlighted the way sports instils lessons for life. He spoke about sports as a form of education in Game for Life: 25 Journeys, published by the Singapore Sports Council in 2013, as "a huge deal for character... Children learn the value of teams. They learn the discipline of repeated practice, and how there is no other way to develop expertise. Plus, the ability to fall or lose in competition and pick oneself up… with humility."

It was given to him by a leading Chinese language specialist in 1995. Tharman has engaged in Chinese calligraphy since 2002.

References

External links 

 Tharman Shanmugaratnam on Singapore Prime Minister's Office
 Tharman Shanmugaratnam on Parliament of Singapore
 Tharman Shanmugaratnam on Taman Jurong

|-

|-

|-

|-

|-

|-

|-

1957 births
Alumni of Wolfson College, Cambridge
Alumni of the University of London
Alumni of the London School of Economics
Anglo-Chinese School alumni
Deputy Prime Ministers of Singapore
Finance ministers of Singapore
Chairmen of the Monetary Authority of Singapore
Ministers for Education of Singapore
Group of Thirty
Honorary Fellows of the London School of Economics
Harvard Kennedy School alumni
Living people
Members of the Cabinet of Singapore
Members of the Parliament of Singapore
People's Action Party politicians
Singaporean Hindus
Singaporean people of Indian descent
Singaporean people of Sri Lankan Tamil descent
Singaporean Tamil politicians
Ministers for Manpower of Singapore